Eikenhof Dam is an earth-fill type dam on the Palmiet River, near Grabouw, Western Cape, South Africa. It was established in 1977. The primary purpose of the dam is for irrigation use and its hazard potential has been ranked high (3).

See also
List of reservoirs and dams in South Africa
List of rivers of South Africa

References 

 List of South African Dams from the Department of Water Affairs and Forestry (South Africa)

Dams in South Africa
Elgin, Western Cape
Dams completed in 1977